The 1920–21 United States collegiate men's ice hockey season was the 27th season of collegiate ice hockey in the United States.

Regular season

Standings

References

1920–21 NCAA Standings

External links
College Hockey Historical Archives

 
College